In Pakistan, a medical school is more often referred to as a medical college. A medical college is affiliated with a university as a department which usually has a separate campus. As of January 2019, there are a total of 114 medical colleges in Pakistan, 44 of which are public and 70 private. All but two colleges are listed in International Medical Education Directory. As per Pakistan Medical Commission 2021 database, there are 176 medical colleges in Pakistan ( Medical and Dental Colleges). About 45 medical colleges are public sector medical colleges, and 72 are private sector medical colleges. In addition, there are 17 Public Dental Colleges and 42 Private Dental Colleges. 

All medical colleges and universities are regulated by the respective provincial department of health. They however have to be recognized after meeting a set criteria by a central regulatory authority called Pakistan Medical Commission and by Higher Education Commission (Pakistan). Entrance into the medical colleges is based on merit under the guidelines of PMC. Both the academic performance at the Higher Secondary School Certificate (HSSC) (grades 11–12) and an entrance test like NMDCAT determine eligibility to enter most of the medical colleges.

Admission process 
To get admission into any government medical college, the weightage is determined by the provincial or federal government. A minimum weightage of 50% should be given to the NMDCAT.  In order to get admission into any private medical college, the following weightage is used:
 50% to the score obtained in National Medical and Dental College Admission Test (NMDCAT) weighted as follows:
Biology: 32%
Chemistry: 26.5%
Physics: 26.5%
English: 10%
Logical Reasoning: 5%
 40% to marks of Higher Secondary School Certificate (HSSC) Pre-Medical.
 10% to marks of Secondary School Certificate (SSC) Science. 

The minimum requirements are:
 65% or above in F-SC /HSSC or A-Levels equivalent IBCC certificate.
 55% or above in NMDCAT for admission in Medical Colleges and 45% or above for Dental Colleges.
The Pakistani government exerts tight control over the available number of open medical school seats in both private and public colleges. The regulation forbids all colleges from admitting any student over the allocated maximum seats for the college under any circumstances.

Medical seats

Curriculum
After successfully completing five years of theoretical and practical (clinical) training in the medical college and affiliated teaching hospitals the graduates are awarded a Bachelor of Medicine and Bachelor of Surgery (MBBS) degree. The graduates are then eligible to apply for a medical license from the PMC. The curriculum for all colleges, irrespective of their regional location and university affiliation, is designed by PMC. The curriculum spans a term of five years or seasons (four professional years).

First year (first professional year – part 1)
Second year (first professional year – part 2)
Third year (second professional year)
Fourth year (third professional year)
Fifth/final year (fourth professional year)

Main courses of the curriculum, respective of the academic year they are examined in, are as follows:

First Professional Year – Part I and II:
Anatomy
Cell Biology and Histology
Cross-sectional Anatomy
Embryology
Gross Anatomy
Neuroanatomy
Radiological Anatomy
Surface Anatomy
Human Physiology
Medical Biochemistry, Molecular Biology and Human Genetics

Second Professional Year:
Behavioral Sciences and Medical Ethics
Legal/Forensic Medicine and Toxicology
General Pathology, Microbiology and Immunology
Pharmacology, Pharmacognosy and Therapeutics
Third Professional Year:
Community Medicine*also called Social or Public Health Medicine
Ophthalmology
Otorhinolaryngostomatology (ENT)
Special/Systemic Pathology

Fourth (final) Professional Year:
Internal Medicine
Medicine I
Angiology
Cardiology
Gastroenterology
Hematology
Hepatology
Medical Oncology
Neurology
Osteology
Pulmonology
Rheumatology
Medicine II
Critical Care Medicine
Dermatology
Endocrinology
Infectious and Venereal diseases
Nephrology
Psychiatry
Gynecology and Obstetrics
Pediatrics

Surgery
Surgery I
Anesthesiology
Operative Care
Plastic and Reconstructive Surgery
Radiology, Radiotherapy and Radiosurgery
Surgical Infections
Surgical and Radiation Oncology
Traumatology (including Burns)
Surgery II
Bariatric Surgery
Cardiothoracic Surgery
General Surgery
Abdominal Surgery
Breast Surgery
Endocrine Surgery
Endoscopic Surgery
Laparoscopic Surgery
Neurosurgery
Oral and Maxillofacial Surgery
Orthopedic Surgery
Pediatric Surgery
Urology (includes Andrology)
Vascular Surgery

* includes Nutrition, Epidemiology, Biostatistics and Research Methods, Health education, Family Planning, Occupational, Environmental, Preventive and Tropical Medicine.

Assessment methods

Theoretical, practical and clinical knowledge is assessed by one or more of the following methods; multiple choice questions (MCQs), short essay questions (SEQs), short answer questions (SAQs), laboratory skills, viva voce, and objective structured clinical examination (OSCE). Required laboratory training is provided in biochemistry, histology, physiology, pharmacology, toxicology, pathology including hematology, immunology and microbiology. Teaching in gross anatomy is assisted by exploratory dissection of cadavers. A mandatory group research project is also to be submitted by the students before the fourth professional examination in the community medicine department. Students are also taught diagnostic imaging and technical report writing in the radiology department.

Clinical training and evaluation sessions (or clerkship) at the affiliated teaching hospitals is also compulsory for all medical students, especially in their second, third and fourth (final) professional years. These include observation, assisting and practice in various emergency, outpatient, inpatient and operative settings in the following rotating disciplines: anesthesiology, cardiology, dermatology, general surgery, gynaecology, internal medicine, obstetrics, ophthalmology, orthoptics, orthopedics, otorhinolaryngology, acoustics, pediatrics, psychiatry, radiology and urology.

Visits to various locations for the purposes of training and understanding of social, legal, communal and preventive aspects of health are also conducted if possible, such as:

Community Medicine
Basic Health Unit (BHU)
Dog bite center
Factory or industrial unit
Hospital waste disposal site
Maternal and Child Health Center (MCHC)
Orphanage
Primary school
Rehabilitation center
Retirement home
Rural Health Center (RHC)
Special education institute
Vaccination center
Water purification plant

Dermatology
Skin laser clinic
Venereal disease control center
Legal and Forensics Medicine
Autopsy rooms
Courtrooms
Site of exhumation
Internal Medicine
Cancer research center
Diabetes clinic
Emergency room
Intensive care unit
Obstetrics
Abortion clinic
Labor room

Ophthalmology
Eye laser clinic
Orthoptics clinic
Otorhinolaryngology
Acoustics laboratory
Hearing aid center
Speech therapy clinic
Pathology
Pathology museum
Psychiatry
Mental asylum
Surgery
Burns unit
Orthotic prosthetic center

Foundation year
Once the student has graduated after passing his or her final (fourth professional) examination, he or she is eligible to apply for a seat as a house officer in either the attached hospital of the college (usually as a paid employee) or in any other tertiary health care hospital (usually as an unpaid employee or "honorary"). The graduate has to first register (provisional) with and acquire a certificate from PMDC. The house officer has to serve for 12 months (foundation year) at one or more hospitals in four modules; 3 months in internal medicine, 3 months in general surgery, 3 months in medicine allied and 3 months in surgery allied in any order. The graduate can then apply for a medical practice license from PMDC which will allow the medical graduate to work as a registered medical professional anywhere in the country and study for higher specialties/qualifications.

 Internal medicine (3 months) – compulsory module
 Medicine allied (3 months) – options include:
Cardiology
Dermatology
Endocrinology
Gastroenterology
Hematology
Nephrology
Neurology
Oncology
Pathology
Pediatric medicine
Psychiatry
Pulmonology (chest medicine)
Rheumatology

 General surgery (3 months) – compulsory module
 Surgery allied (3 months) – options include:
Anesthesiology and intensive care medicine
Cardiovascular surgery
ENT, head and neck surgery
Gynecology and Obstetrics
Neurosurgery
Ophthalmology
Orthopedics
Plastic and reconstructive surgery
Pediatric surgery
Radiology and radiosurgery
Thoracic surgery
Urology

List of medical college
Punjab

Public

Private

Sindh

Public

Private

Khyber Pakhtunkhwa (KPK)

Public

Private

Balochistan

Public

Private

Azad Jammu and Kashmir (AJK)

Public

Private

Public health education
All medical students are taught various aspects of public health such as:
Auxology
Biological Weaponry and Hazards
Biostatistics
Case Reporting
Child and Maternal Healthcare
Community Dentistry
Community Genetics and Genomics
Community Ophthalmology
Community Psychiatry
Data Collection and Archiving
Disaster Management
Environmental Medicine (including Sanitation and Hospital Waste Management)
Epidemiology and Epidemic Control
Euthenics
Family Planning and Birth Control
Food, Nutrition and Hygiene
Global Health and Organizations
Health Economics
Health Education
Health Surveillance
Healthcare Systems
Healthcare Infrastructure and Ergonomics
Labor Health
Occupational Safety and Medicine
Outreach Methods
Population Demographics
Preventive Medicine (including vaccines)
Rehabilitative Care
Research Methods
Resource Allocation
Pharmaceutical Policy and Drug Trials
Public Health Law and Reforms
Social Health Determinants
Tropical Medicine and Vector Control
Telemedicine
Venereal Disease Control and HIV/AIDS

See also
Medical school
List of medical schools
List of medical organizations in Pakistan
Pakistan Medical and Dental Council

References

External links
PMDC official website

Pakistan